Aesja Taylor Essix is an American singer-songwriter.

Early life

Aesja is a young American singer from The Woodlands, Texas (born in Dover, Delaware). Younger sister of hip-hop artist Lil JSean, when her other brother died in 2010, it motivated her to chase her dreams in the music industry. Aesja has been singing since the age of three. She started making videos of her singing cover songs on the Mac her parents bought for her and JSean. At the same time, he was putting out videos on YouTube and sharing his music.

Aesja got more comfortable with singing in front of audiences by singing at summer student council conventions. Throughout all four years of high school, Aesja ran for president her junior year where she sang her speech through the intercom. After that, she started doing performances with her brother during her junior year of high school to feel more at ease with the transitions.

Career

Aesja took the next step in her music career when she was featured on "You’re Not Welcome", a song from Lil JSean off his first mixtape and was flooded requests to do features with other artists. Aesja's music career took a turn for the best by getting featured in Billboard, Great Day Houston and CW39's Eye Opener to hosting and performing at West Virginia University's Spring Fling.

From opening gigs for Waka Flocka, T-Mills, Nipsey Hussle and Riff Raff to hosting her own SXSW event with Torchy Taco's in 2015 with her brother. Aesja's was recently a guest feature on Cyhi The Prynce’s latest song "Long Damn Time".

Trust 'Em release

As an independent artist, Aesja has a flair for "Doing It Yourself". Aesja creatively directed, styled, cast, produced and edited the viral video "Trust Em" with Lil JSean. The DIY video has hit over half a million YouTube views and viewed 3 million times on Twitter.

Balance EP

Aesja released her first EP Balance in 2014. The song "Balance" off the EP garnered 30,000 SoundCloud listens after being tweeted by stylist Ian Connor.

Discography 

 Balance EP (2014)
 Trust ‘Em [Music Video] (2016)
 Cyhi The Prynce [Music Video] (2016)
 Sky's Falling – Single (2017)

References

Year of birth missing (living people)
American women rappers
People from Dover, Delaware
People from The Woodlands, Texas
Rappers from Texas
Living people
21st-century American women